Ivan Adrianovich Mikhailov (1891 – 30 August 1946) was a Russian politician, economist, and White émigré who served in the Provisional All-Russian Government of Alexander Kolchak as Minister of Finance from January 1918 to 16 August 1919, during the Russian Civil War. Following the defeat of the Whites and the establishment of the Soviet Union, Mikhailov fled to Harbin and worked with the Japanese forces in Manchukuo, serving on the board of the Chinese Eastern Railway. Following the Soviet invasion of Manchuria, Mikhailov was captured by SMERSH and executed in 1946. Mikhailov was also known as the "Grey Cardinal" of the White movement, due to his influence on Kolchak, or as the "Siberian Machiavelli", due to his frequent participation in plots and conspiracies.

References 

1891 births
1946 deaths
Executed politicians
Executed Russian people
People of the Russian Civil War
Russian anti-communists
Russian economists
People of Manchukuo
Russian counter-revolutionaries
Emigrants from the Russian Empire to Japan
Emigrants from the Russian Empire to China
Russian collaborators with Imperial Japan

People executed by the Soviet Union by firearm